The Institut des Sciences de l'Ingénieur de Toulon et du Var, or ISITV, is a French public engineering school. It offers a diploma recognized by the Commission of Registered Engineers. It is located in the south of France, between Toulon and Hyères, on the French Riviera. The School was established in 1991 by combining the teaching and research resources of the University of the South, Toulon-Var with support and collaboration from industry.

Engineering majors

Marine Engineering
The Marine Engineering option at ISITV is a training that aims to train engineers who possess a solid scientific knowledge of the marine environment and the relevant technologies. This option provides students with the high level skills required in marine technology, offshore petroleum industry, coastal engineering, underwater robotics, remote sensing (ocean acoustics and optics)... starting from the basic sciences required to understand and describe the marine environment, hydrodynamics and fluid mechanics, oceanography, soil physics, strength of materials, corrosion....

There is a possibility of double diploma with Cranfield University (Master of Science Offshore and Ocean Technology) in England, and with the Escola Politécnica of the University of São Paulo in Brazil. Moreover, there is also a possibility to spend a term at the Polytechnic University of Turin in Italy.

The School possesses several important experimental structures, including a surge tank and a wave tank for studies in ocean engineering. For numerical modelling, students have access to a variety of scientific software in different areas (fluid mechanics, hydrodynamics, structures). Practicals at sea enable the students to become familiar with modern methods of measurement.

This training leads to numerous job opportunities at the national and international levels in such varied domains as offshore engineering, the protection of the seashore and offshore structures, undersea robotics, and oceanography.

Materials Engineering
The engineer trained in this option biased towards the development of products, is capable of rapidly assuming responsibility in the design and realisation of complex systems.

There is a possibility of double diploma with Cranfield University (Master of Science Advanced Materials, Master of Science Microsystems & Nanotechnology) in England.

Telecommunications Engineering
The objective is to train engineers who are specialists in the modern methods of telecommunications with regard to the acquisition, transmission, and processing of information, data and signals (sound, images, shapes, etc.)

There is a possibility of double diploma with Cranfield University in England.

Mathematics Engineering
The objective of this major is to train engineers who can fit into any of the engineering disciplines; engineers who are specialists in mathematical and numerical analysis, the type of engineers industry needs to create and use mathematical models and algorithms to solve complex problems.

This major is no more available; the option was closed in 2007

Research
Students can continue at the post-graduate and doctoral level in the various laboratories of the university. Four laboratories are geographically located at ISITV :
 Complex Naval Systems Laboratory
 MAPIEM  - Applied Chemistry Laboratory
 LSEET - Laboratory for the Study Particulate Exchanges at Interfaces
 IMATH - Institute of Mathematics of Toulon
The integration of these research teams in the School places them at the interface between University Research and the world of work.

See also
 University of the South, Toulon-Var

External links
 Institut des sciences de l'ingénieur de Toulon et du Var (French)
 University of the South, Toulon-Var

Notes and sources

Engineering universities and colleges in France
Grandes écoles
Educational institutions established in 1991
Schools of informatics
1991 establishments in France